Hillis's dwarf salamander (Eurycea hillisi) is a species of salamander endemic to the southern United States.

Taxonomy 
It was previously thought to be a population of the southeastern dwarf salamander (E. quadridigitata) but a 2017 study found it to be a distinct species based on genetic evidence, and described it as E. hillisi. It is named in honor of American evolutionary biologist David Hillis. It is unlikely that any previous studies had analyzed populations of this species.

Distribution 
It is found throughout the southern half of Alabama outside of the Mobile Bay region, and ranges east into mid-central Georgia and south to the central Florida Panhandle.

References 

hillisi
Endemic fauna of the United States
Amphibians of the United States
Fauna of the Southeastern United States
Amphibians described in 2017